Alain Turicchia (born 4 September 1975) is a former Italian cyclist. He rode in the 1998 Tour de France, where he finished in 74th place and was 9th in the Points classification.

Major results
1996
3rd Giro del Medio Brenta
2000
1st stage 2 Vuelta a Castilla y León

References

1975 births
Living people
Italian male cyclists
People from Faenza
Sportspeople from the Province of Ravenna
Cyclists from Emilia-Romagna